Smith's Grain and Feed Store is a historic feed store located at Elnora, Saratoga County, New York. It was built in 1892, and is a 2 1/2-story, gable roofed frame building with three additions.  It is sheathed in clapboard and has a standing seam metal roof topped by an air vent cupola. Also on the property is a contributing railroad building; a 1 1/2-story, rectangular frame building dated to the early-20th century.

It was listed on the National Register of Historic Places in 2012.

References

Commercial buildings on the National Register of Historic Places in New York (state)
Victorian architecture in New York (state)
Commercial buildings completed in 1892
Buildings and structures in Saratoga County, New York
National Register of Historic Places in Saratoga County, New York
Feed stores